NJToday.net is New Jersey's oldest weekly newspaper in both its printed (ISSN number 2328-6113) and online (ISSN number 2328-6121) formats.

Established in 1822 and formerly known as the News Record, NJToday.net offers local news coverage of communities throughout Union and Middlesex counties in New Jersey.

With newspaper publication offices located at 1139 East Jersey St., Suite 503, Elizabeth, NJ 07201, the Editor is Paul W. Hadsall, Jr. and the Publisher is Lisa McCormick.  Among the regular contributors is James J. Devine, a controversial Democratic Party strategist and political commentator who authors a column entitled "Voice of the People." The newspaper is published every Friday in Elizabeth.

History
Established in 1822 as the Bridgeton Museum and later renamed the National Advocate, NJToday.net remains the oldest weekly newspaper in continuous publication in the Garden State.

Over the years, the publication underwent a variety of name changes and mergers. In 1946, the Rahway News and the Rahway Record merged, with the new paper called the Rahway News-Record and taking on the numbering of the Rahway Record.

In 1997, the Rahway News-Record was purchased by Devine Media Enterprises, owned by James J. Devine. The paper's distribution expanded beyond Rahway to include Elizabeth, Linden and the rest of Union County, New Jersey. CMD Media acquired the News Record and Lisa McCormick became its publisher in 2006.  The paper was re-branded as NJToday.net in 2010 to tie the weekly print edition with expanded online content at the publication's website.

Among the publication titles that have been absorbed into NJToday.net in recent years are: The News Record, Clark Patriot, Atom Tabloid, South Amboy Citizen, Perth Amboy Gazette, Amboy Beacon, and Kid Zone magazine.

References

Newspapers published in New Jersey
Companies based in Elizabeth, New Jersey